Canberra Secondary School is a co-educational government secondary school of the Ministry of Education (Singapore) ; located in Sembawang, Singapore.

History
Canberra Secondary School opened its doors on 3 January 2000 with Puvan Ariaratnam as its first principal. It is the second secondary school to be built in Sembawang after Sembawang Secondary School in 1999.

In 2017, Canberra Secondary School began to use the vision "Grateful, Respectful and Compassionate", with the aim of embodying the values of gratitude, respect and compassion in students.

In 2021, Canberra Secondary School launched the Canberran Enrichment Programme, which allows students to explore different programmes besides the existing co-curricular activities.

Applied Learning Programme
Canberra Secondary School's Applied Learning Programme, Digital Media, was launched in 2016. The programme allows students to acquire knowledge and skills in digital media.

The school's Direct School Admission (DSA) programme is also based on digital media and allows Primary 6 students to obtain an early placement into the school provided that the student meets the school's DSA criteria and passes the selection process.

Learning for Life Programme
Canberra Secondary School's Learning for Life Programme is Community Youth Leadership. The programme aims to develop students' character and leadership qualities so that they can be encouraged to make an impact in their community regularly.

The school's Values-in-Action (VIA) Programme is called the 2:168 Contributors Programme, with teachers and students taking two hours in a week to devote themselves to community service.

Principals

Co-curricular activities
As of 2022, Canberra Secondary School has 12 co-curricular activities. Each student must be affiliated with at least one co-curricular activity unless special circumstances are given.

Visual and Performing Arts
Digital Media in Visual Arts Club
Choir
Guzheng Ensemble
Dance Club
Concert Band

Sports
Badminton
Volleyball

Uniformed Groups
Boys' Brigade
Girls' Brigade
National Cadet Corps (Sea)
National Police Cadet Corps
National Civil Defence Cadet Corps

References

Secondary schools in Singapore
Schools in Singapore by region